Baguio City Economic Zone is a special purpose development zone located in the city of Baguio in the Cordillera Administrative Region. It is operated by the Philippine Economic Zone Authority, an agency in charge of developing and operating special economic zones in the Philippines. Atty. Rene Joey S. Mipa is the current Zone Administrator of BCEZ, after Atty. Dante M. Quindoza.

See also
Cagayan Special Economic Zone
Cavite Economic Zone

References

Industrial parks in the Philippines
Buildings and structures in Baguio
PEZA Special Economic Zones